Ali-Ashraf Sadeghi (born 15 May 1941) is an Iranian linguist and emeritus professor of linguistics at the University of Tehran. He is known for his expertise on Persian grammar. Sadeghi is a permanent member of the Academy of Persian Language and Literature. A festschrift in his honor, edited by Omid Tabibzadeh, was published in 2003.

Books
 Persian Grammar
 Formation of the Persian Language

References

1941 births
Living people
People from Qom
Linguists from Iran
Phoneticians
English–Persian translators
Academic staff of the University of Tehran
Alumni of University College London
Iranian phonologists
Iranian grammarians
Linguists of Persian
Iranian Science and Culture Hall of Fame recipients in Literature and Culture
Iran's Book of the Year Awards recipients
Faculty of Letters and Humanities of the University of Tehran alumni